Quiché Airport  is an airport serving Santa Cruz del Quiché, the capital of Quiché Department, Guatemala. The airport is just south of the city.

See also
 Transport in Guatemala
 List of airports in Guatemala

References

External links
 OpenStreetMap - Quiché
 OurAirports - Quiché
 SkyVector - Quiche Airport
 

Airports in Guatemala
Quiché Department
Santa Cruz del Quiché